The 2015–16 Football League (known as the Sky Bet Football League for sponsorship reasons) was the 117th season of The Football League. It began on 7 August 2015 and concluded on 30 May 2016, with the League Two play-off final at Wembley Stadium. The Football League was contested through three Divisions: the Championship, League One and League Two. The winners of the Championship, Burnley, and runners-up, Middlesbrough, were automatically promoted to the Premier League and on 28 May 2016 were joined by the winners of the Championship play-off, Hull City. The bottom two teams in League Two, Dagenham & Redbridge and York City, were relegated to the National League.

It was the last season that the league would be known simply as The Football League; from the 2016–17 season onwards, it would be known as the English Football League.

Promotion and relegation

From the Premier League
 Relegated to the Championship
 Hull City
 Burnley
 Queens Park Rangers

From the Championship
 Promoted to the Premier League
 Bournemouth
 Watford
 Norwich City

 Relegated to League One
 Millwall
 Wigan Athletic
 Blackpool

From League One
 Promoted to the Championship
 Bristol City
 Milton Keynes Dons
 Preston North End

 Relegated to League Two
 Notts County
 Crawley Town
 Leyton Orient
 Yeovil Town

From League Two
 Promoted to League One
 Burton Albion
 Shrewsbury Town
 Bury
 Southend United

 Relegated to the National League
 Cheltenham Town
 Tranmere Rovers

From the Conference National
 Barnet
 Bristol Rovers

Championship

Table

Play-offs

Results

League One

Table

Play-offs

Results

League Two

Table

Play-offs

Results

Managerial changes

References

 
2015-16